The Eunice Kennedy Shriver Stadium (formerly Special Olympics Stadium) is a stadium in Brockport, New York.  Located on the campus of State University of New York College at Brockport it is primarily used by the Brockport Golden Eagles. The stadium holds 11,000 people and was built in 1979. It was originally built for the 1979 Special Olympics World Summer Games that were held in Brockport. Brockport's American football, field hockey, men's and women's soccer, lacrosse and outdoor track and field teams host their home games at Eunice Kennedy Shriver Stadium. The Rochester River Dogz FC soccer club played here in 2016.

Events
In 1979, the Special Olympics World Summer Games were held here.
In 1997, the U.S women's soccer team played a friendly match vs. the Rochester Ravens in front of 9,131 spectators. Team USA won 8–0.
In 2014, it served as the home venue of the Rochester Dragons of the American Ultimate Disc League.
The Rochester Rattlers of the Major League Lacrosse played here during the 2015 season.
The stadium hosted the New York State Special Olympics in 2015 and 2016.

References

College football venues
Sports venues in New York (state)
Sports venues in Monroe County, New York
Brockport Golden Eagles football
National Premier Soccer League stadiums
Former Major League Lacrosse venues
1979 establishments in New York (state)
Sports venues completed in 1979
Ultimate (sport) venues
Lacrosse venues in New York (state)
Soccer venues in New York (state)
College track and field venues in the United States
Athletics (track and field) venues in New York (state)
College field hockey venues in the United States
College lacrosse venues in the United States
American football venues in New York (state)